FC Lokomotiv, Lokomotiv FC, or Lokomotiv FK may refer to one of the following association football clubs.

FC Lokomotiv Moscow
PFC Lokomotiv Plovdiv
PFC Lokomotiv Sofia
FC Lokomotiv-2 Moscow
FC Lokomotiv-KMV Mineralnye Vody
FC Lokomotiv Dryanovo
FC Lokomotiv Gorna Oryahovitsa
FC Lokomotiv Jalal-Abad
FC Lokomotiv Kaluga
FC Lokomotiv Liski
FC Lokomotiv Moscow
FC Lokomotiv Nizhny Novgorod
FC Lokomotiv Saint Petersburg
FC Lokomotiv Vitebsk (disambiguation)
FC Lokomotiv Vitebsk (defunct)
FC Lokomotivi Tbilisi
Lokomotiv-Bilajary FK
Lokomotiv Cove FC
Lokomotiv FK (Tashkent)